Flight Into Nowhere is a 1938 American adventure film directed by Lewis D. Collins, and produced by Larry Darmour for Columbia Pictures. The film stars Jack Holt, Jacqueline Wells and Dick Purcell. In the low-budget action film, the locale of South America jungles provides an exciting venue for "flyboy" Jack Holt, who is trying to establish a new route for an American airline.

Plot
Headstrong pilot Bill Kellogg (Dick Purcell), despite landing safely, flew his airliner into a storm, and is fired. When, his boss at Trans Continental Airways, Jim Horne (Jack Holt), finds out Bill has secretly wed Joan Hammond (Jacqueline Wells), the daughter of the airline's owner, he relents and allows Bill to keep his job.

Fellow pilot, Ike Matthews (James Burke), is assigned to a proving flight over the western coast of the South American jungle to photograph potential landing fields. Bill is jealous of the publicity that the first flight will achieve and steals the aircraft to do the job himself. Flying in the same irresponsible way that made him dangerous, Bill pushes on, even when he is radioed that there is insufficient fuel on board.

In running out of gas, Bill chooses to crash-land near an Indian village. Only an Indian woman, L-ana (Karen Sorrell) helps Bill, as the villagers refuse to help him get back to civilization. Bill tries but is unable to get the radio working to send out an emergency message. Jim and Ike fly over the South American jungle, but a storm prevents them from spotting the village. They continue on to Rio Vista where the pilots meet Joan and for her sake, Jim organizes a rescue mission.

Led by natives, the rescuers finds a village holding Dr. Butler (Robert Fiske) captive. After a fierce battle, the doctor is freed but meanwhile, Bill, despondent over his fate, has taken on the native ways by marrying L-ana. Jim's expedition finally locates the tribe, but when he sees Bill's new life and native marriage, the two men cannot reconcile what has happened.

Knowing he is now able to get back home, Bill leaves without L-ana, but her brother (Fritz Leiber) is enraged at this affront, and kills him. After returning to Rio Vista, Jim tells Joan that Bill died in the accident, sacrificing himself to avoid landing in a field full of women and children. Bill is able to allow Joan to accept that her husband still loved her and died courageously.

Cast
 Jack Holt as Jim Horne
 Jacqueline Wells as Joan Hammond
 Dick Purcell as Bill Kellogg
 James Burke as Ike Matthews
 Karen Sorrell as L-ana
 Fritz Leiber as Ti-ana
 Howard Hickman as Howard Hammond
 Robert Fiske as Dr. Butler
 Hector Sarno as Vincente
 Agostino Borgato as Cannibal

Production
Principal photography on Flight Into Nowhere, took place from January 20 to February 8, 1938, at the United Airport, Burbank (Los Angeles).

The aircraft used in Flight Into Nowhere were: 
 Douglas DC-3A-197 c/n 1929, NC16090 
 Northrop Gamma 2D2  c/n 12, NC2111
 Lockheed Model 12A Super Electra c/n 1220, NC17376
 Douglas O-38B 
 Ryan STA c/n 128, NC16039
 Fairchild 24C-8C c/n 2689, NC15346 
 Boeing 247D c/n 1682, NC13301
 Beechcraft Model 17 Staggerwing NC1440 
 Lockheed Vega c/n 11, NC7044

Reception
Aviation film historian James H. Farmer in Celluloid Wings: The Impact of Movies on Aviation (1984) described Flight Into Nowhere as  "fast-paced formula fare".

References

Notes

Citations

Bibliography

 Farmer, James H. Celluloid Wings: The Impact of Movies on Aviation. Blue Ridge Summit, Pennsylvania: Tab Books Inc., 1984. . 
 Paris, Michael. From the Wright Brothers to Top Gun: Aviation, Nationalism, and Popular Cinema. Manchester, UK: Manchester University Press, 1995. .
 Pendo, Stephen. Aviation in the Cinema. Lanham, Maryland: Scarecrow Press, 1985. .

External links
 
 
 
 

1938 films
American aviation films
1930s English-language films
American adventure films
American black-and-white films
1938 adventure films
Films directed by Lewis D. Collins
1930s American films